James Barrington may refer to:
 James Barrington (diplomat) (1911–1992), Burmese diplomat
 Jimmy Barrington (1901 – after 1937), English footballer
 James Barrington (cricketer) (born 1960), English cricketer